Kristine Chioma Anigwe (born March 31, 1997) is an American professional basketball player. She also plays for Turkish team Çukurova Basketbol in the Women's Basketball Super League.

Early life
Kristine Anigwe was born in London to Nigerian parents. She and her siblings were raised in Phoenix, Arizona and attended Desert Vista High School. At age 17, Anigwe became a U.S. citizen in June 2014.

In her upperclassman years, Anigwe won two consecutive FIBA age group World Championships competing for the United States, first with the under-17s in 2014 and then with the under-19s in 2015. Anigwe scored in double figures in all 27 games for Desert Vista in her senior season, leading the state with 21.1 points and 13.3 rebounds per game and registering 17 double-doubles.

College career
Before her junior year of high school, Anigwe accepted an offer to play college basketball at the University of California, Berkeley, where she would major in sociology.

Freshman season
In her first season with California in 2015–16, Anigwe won eight consecutive Pac-12 Conference Freshman of the Week honors. She led the Golden Bears in points, rebounds, field goal percentage, field goals made, blocks, free throws made, and free throw attempts. Anigwe was voted to the 2016 Pac-12 Conference women's basketball tournament All-Tournament Team, and she was named the women's USBWA National Freshman of the Year following the season.

Sophomore season
Anigwe's success continued as a sophomore, as she became the first player in California history to average 20 points per game in consecutive seasons. On December 8, 2016, Anigwe recorded the first 50-point game in Golden Bears history, scoring 50 in only 24 minutes against Sacramento State. A month later, on January 8, she became the fastest player in Pac-12 history to reach 1,000 points, hitting the milestone in a loss to eventual Elite Eight participant Oregon. Anigwe continued to lead the Golden Bears in points and rebounds, also leading in field goal percentage and blocks.

For the second consecutive year, Anigwe was named to the Pac-12 All-Tournament Team. Anigwe saw her first NCAA tournament action, in which the Golden Bears narrowly defeated LSU before falling to No. 1 seed Baylor.

Junior season
Anigwe registered 28 points and 25 rebounds in a win against Brown on November 19, 2017, achieving the first 25–25 game in Division I women's basketball in three years.

For the third consecutive season, Anigwe led California in points and rebounds as a junior, and was named to the All-Pac-12 Team. She was also a late season nominee for the 2018 Wade Trophy, John R. Wooden Award, Naismith College Player of the Year, and Katrina McClain Awards. California were upset in the first round of the 2018 NCAA tournament by Virginia.

Senior season
As a senior in 2018–19, Anigwe posted career highs in points (22.3) and rebounds per game (16.2), leading the country in rebounds. She became the third California Golden Bear to score 2,000 career points on December 2, 2018 in a win against Cal State Northridge.

Anigwe set multiple school and conference records during her senior season. On February 8 and 10, 2019, Anigwe broke California's scoring and rebounding records in consecutive home losses to Oregon State and Oregon.

In her final regular-season college game on March 3, 2019 at Washington State, Anigwe scored 32 points and added 30 rebounds. In doing so, she both set the Pac-12 women's rebounding record, and became the first Division I player since 2002 to record 30 points and rebounds in a single game.

Anigwe and California received an at-large big to the 2019 NCAA tournament, in which they defeated North Carolina before falling to eventual national champions Baylor.

Following the season, Anigwe was named the Naismith Defensive Player of the Year.

California statistics

Source

Professional career

Anigwe was selected ninth overall in the 2019 WNBA draft by the Connecticut Sun.

On August 6, 2019, Anigwe was traded to the Dallas Wings in exchange for Theresa Plaisance.

On May 26, 2020, Anigwe was traded to the Los Angeles Sparks in exchange for a second-round 2021 draft pick.

After spending time with both the Wings and Sparks in 2021, Anigwe was signed by her hometown Phoenix Mercury ahead of the 2022 WNBA season.

WNBA career statistics

Regular season

|-
| style="text-align:left;"| 2019
| style="text-align:left;"| Connecticut
| 17 || 0 || 7.1 || .314 || .000 || .706 || 1.8 || 0.2 || 0.4 || 0.2 || 0.6 || 2.0
|-
| style="text-align:left;"| 2019
| style="text-align:left;"| Dallas
| 10 || 0 || 12.9 || .333 || .000 || .667 || 3.6 || 0.3 || 0.3 || 0.4 || 0.7 || 3.2
|-
| style="text-align:left;"| 2020
| style="text-align:left;"| Los Angeles
| 17 || 1 || 11.6 || .604 || .000 || .538 || 2.6 || 0.2 || 0.6 || 0.4 || 0.9 || 4.6
|-
| style="text-align:left;"| 2021
| style="text-align:left;"| Dallas
| 3 || 0 || 10.0 || .500 || .000 || .500 || 2.0 || 0.0 || 0.3 || 0.0 || 0.7 || 2.3
|-
| style="text-align:left;"| 2021
| style="text-align:left;"| Los Angeles
| 7 || 1 || 15.1 || .391 || .000 || .563 || 3.9 || 0.7 || 0.6 || 0.1 || 1.4 || 3.9
|-
| style="text-align:left;"| 2022
| style="text-align:left;"| Phoenix
| 10 || 1 || 6.5 || .500 || .000 || .500 || 1.3 || 0.2 || 0.1 || 0.2 || 0.6 || 1.5
|-
| style='text-align:left;'| Career
| style='text-align:left;'| 4 years, 4 teams
| 64 || 3 || 10.1 || .444 || .000 || .593 || 2.5 || 0.3 || 0.4 || 0.3 || 0.8 || 3.0

Postseason

|-
| style='text-align:left;'|2020
| style='text-align:left;'|Los Angeles
| 1 || 1 || 18.0 || .600 || .000 || 1.000 || 7.0 || 0.0 || 0.0 || 1.0 || 1.0 || 8.0
|-
| align="left" | Career
| align="left" | 1 year, 1 team
| 1 || 1 || 18.0 || .600 || .000 || 1.000 || 7.0 || 0.0 || 0.0 || 1.0 || 1.0 || 8.0
|}

References

External links
Cal Golden Bears bio

1997 births
Living people
All-American college women's basketball players
American sportspeople of Nigerian descent
American women's basketball players
Basketball players from Phoenix, Arizona
Basketball players from Greater London
Black British sportswomen
California Golden Bears women's basketball players
Centers (basketball)
Connecticut Sun draft picks
Connecticut Sun players
Dallas Wings players
English emigrants to the United States
English people of Nigerian descent
English women's basketball players
Los Angeles Sparks players
McDonald's High School All-Americans
Parade High School All-Americans (girls' basketball)
Phoenix Mercury players
Power forwards (basketball)